Kathryn "Trina" Shoemaker is an American mixer, record producer and sound engineer responsible for producing/engineering and/or mixing records for bands such as Queens of the Stone Age,  Sheryl Crow, Emmylou Harris, Something for Kate, Nanci Griffith, Kristin Hersh, and many more.

Early life and career
Shoemaker was born in Joliet, Illinois, and attended Joliet Central High School.

After graduating in 1983, she moved to Los Angeles and got a job working as a secretary at Capitol Records. She then briefly moved to London where she worked with artist Hugh Harris. On her return to the United States, she began working for producer Daniel Lanois at Kingsway Studios in New Orleans. In 1992 she became the studio's house engineer. Her break came in 1995 when Sheryl Crow fired her producer and hired Shoemaker to engineer her self-produced, self-titled second album Sheryl Crow. In 1998 Shoemaker became the first woman to win the Grammy Award for Best Engineered Album for her work on The Globe Sessions. In addition to Crow, Shoemaker went on to work with artists such as Blues Traveller, Emmylou Harris, the Indigo Girls and the Dixie Chicks.

List of works

Live with the University of Colorado Symphony Orchestra by Indigo Girls, 2018 (producer)

Awards
 Grammy Award winner:
2004 Best Pop/Contemporary Gospel Album: Steven Curtis Chapman, All Things New  
1998 Best Engineered Album (Non-Classical): Sheryl Crow, The Globe Sessions  
1998 Best Rock Album Engineer: Sheryl Crow, The Globe Sessions

References

External links

Interview with Trina Shoemaker on Being an Engineer and Producer

Record producers from Illinois
Living people
Grammy Award winners
American audio engineers
Musicians from Joliet, Illinois
1965 births
Women audio engineers
1999 albums
Engineers from Illinois
American women record producers